The New Zealand physical disability national rugby league team represent New Zealand in international physical disability rugby league competitions throughout Asia-Pacific and the World. At the 2018 Rugby League Commonwealth Championship the team finished second in the Physical Disability tournament after a draw in the final against Australia. In August 2018 a squad was named to take part in a best of three series against Australia as part of the 2018 Emerging Nations World Championship in Sydney.

In October 2022 the team competed at the 2021 Physical Disability Rugby League World Cup where they came second in the tournament.

Current squad
Squad for 2021 PDRL World Cup.
Head coach: Ray Greaves

 Harley Roach
 Garry Kingi
 Jeremy Hendrix Harris
 Max Walsh
 Shane Culling
 Timothy Ragg
 Kent Stroobant
 Jed Stone
 Shane Ratahi
 Mal Davis
 Matthew Williams
 Michael Kulene
 Daley Manu
 Che Fornusek
 Philip Milne
 Roko Nailolo
 Matthew Slade
 Delta Taeauga

source:

Results

Notes

References

Physical Disability international rugby league teams
Parasports in New Zealand